Medarametla is a village situated in Prakasam district.

References

Villages in Prakasam district